The 1993–94 Hong Kong First Division League season was the 83rd since its establishment.

League table

References
1993–94 Hong Kong First Division table (RSSSF)

Hong Kong First Division League seasons
1993–94 in Asian association football leagues
First Division